Kalacheyevsky (masculine), Kalacheyevskaya (feminine), or Kalacheyevskoye (neuter) may refer to:

Kalacheyevsky District, Voronezh Oblast, Russia
Kalacheyevsky (rural locality), Voronezh Oblast, Russia

See also
Kalachevsky (disambiguation)
Kalach (disambiguation)